Ljubiša "Leo" Stevanović (Serbian Cyrillic: Љубиша Стевановић; 4 January 1910 – 17 May 1978) was a Serbian footballer who represented Yugoslavia (4 caps, 0 goals).

References
 Profile on Serbian federation site

1910 births
1978 deaths
Footballers from Belgrade
Association football defenders
Serbian footballers
Yugoslav footballers
Yugoslavia international footballers
SK Jedinstvo Beograd players
OFK Beograd players
FC Sète 34 players
AS Saint-Étienne players
Ligue 1 players
Ligue 2 players
1930 FIFA World Cup players
Yugoslav football managers
Serbian football managers
FC Sète 34 managers
AC Avignonnais players